John Paesano (born July 2, 1977) is an American composer working primarily in film, television and video games. He is known for collaborating with director Wes Ball on the Maze Runner film series, as well as composing for the Marvel Television series Daredevil and The Defenders. As a video game composer, he has contributed music to the acclaimed titles, Detroit Become Human, Marvel's Spider-Man and Marvel's Spider-Man: Miles Morales. For his work on Miles Morales, Paesano won the BAFTA for Best music in a video game.

Biography 
Paesano was born in Detroit. He first studied classical music at Conservatoire de Paris located in Parc de la Villette, France before continuing his studies at Berklee College of Music pursuing a major in musical composition and film scoring. John knew from the age of nine years old, he wanted to become a music composer. He then worked under composers Jerry Goldsmith and John Williams providing additional music for the former, and orchestrating for the latter. Paesano cites Steven Spielberg's 1987 film Empire of the Sun as his motivation for getting into film scoring.

In 2014, Paesano was hired to compose the music for The Maze Runner. Speaking of the job, he recalled seeing Wes Ball's 2011 short film, Ruin and was intrigued by it, composing a short demo (which eventually would become the "Maze Runner" theme) for Ball. He visited the sets in New Orleans, observing the "environmental soundscape" and tried to incorporate the natural sounds into his score. He recorded the score with an orchestra at the Newman Scoring Stage with sessions running for 2 weeks. Paesano would later return to score the 2nd and 3rd film of the series, Maze Runner: The Scorch Trials and Maze Runner: The Death Cure.

Paesano was later tasked with composing the score to Spider-Man developed by Insomniac Games, joining the game's development in the early stages. He worked with game director Bryan Intihar and brought about creating several character themes, emphasising the need for the music to be its "own character" in the game. Paesano ensured that his music struck a balance between the cinematics and the gameplay as he wanted the player to be fully immersed. He looked at distinguishing his music from past Spider-Man films and games and decided to focus on creating a musical identity for Peter Parker.

In 2021, he composed the music for the Avengers Campus themed area at Disney California Adventure, combining themes from the MCU's Avengers, Spider-Man, Doctor Strange, Guardians of the Galaxy, Ant-Man, Captain Marvel, and Black Panther films; a single entitled "Welcome Recruits" was released in April 2022.

Filmography

Film

Television

Video games

Theme park attractions

Awards

References

External links 

John Paesano on Twitter

1977 births
21st-century American composers
21st-century classical composers
American classical composers
American film score composers
American male classical composers
American male film score composers
American television composers
Animation composers
Berklee College of Music alumni
Classical musicians from Michigan
Conservatoire de Paris alumni
Hollywood Records artists
Living people
Male television composers
Musicians from Detroit
Video game composers